Kabeeb Mohamed Thowfeek (born 4 April 1958; also known as Thideer Thowfeek) is a Sri Lankan politician and former Member of Parliament.

Early life and family
Thowfeek was born on 4 April 1958. He is the brother of M. S. Thowfeek.

Career
Thowfeek contested the 2001 parliamentary election as one of the United National Front's (UNF) candidates in Trincomalee District. He was elected and entered Parliament. He contested the 2004 parliamentary election as a Sri Lanka Muslim Congress (SLMC) candidate in Trincomalee District but failed to get re-elected after coming fifth amongst the SLMC candidates.

Thowfeek contested the 2006 local government election as an independent group candidate and was elected to Muttur Divisional Council, becoming its chairman. Thowfeek contested the 2008 provincial council election as one of the United People's Freedom Alliance's (UPFA) candidates in Trincomalee District but failed to get elected to the Eastern Provincial Council.

Thowfeek contested the 2010 parliamentary election as one of the UPFA's candidates in Trincomalee District but failed to get elected after coming sixth amongst the UPFA candidates.

Electoral history

References

1958 births
Living people
Local authority councillors of Sri Lanka
Members of the 12th Parliament of Sri Lanka
People from Eastern Province, Sri Lanka
Sri Lanka Muslim Congress politicians
Sri Lankan Moor politicians
Sri Lankan Muslims
United People's Freedom Alliance politicians